John Charles Edward "Carlos" Pamintuan Celdran (November 10, 1972 – October 8, 2019) was a Filipino artist, tour guide, segment TV host and cultural activist. He was known for "Walk This Way", a guided tour of the Manila districts of Intramuros, Binondo, and Quiapo using a combination of music, visuals, and history lectures to immerse tourists into what was life like during the Spanish and American colonization periods of the Philippines. He was also known for engaging in a controversial protest, known colloquially as his "Damaso stunt", in the Manila Cathedral in September 2010, leading to his arrest for "offending religious feelings" as per Article 133 of the Revised Penal Code. In January 2019, the conviction forced Celdran to go on self-exile in Madrid, Spain, where he died of cardiac arrest on October 8 of that year.

Early life and education
Celdran was born as John Charles Edward Pamintuan Celdran, was raised in Dasmariñas Village in Makati. He was a self-identified Roman Catholic educated by priests when he was a boy.

Celdran graduated from high school at Colegio San Agustin – Makati. He graduated from the University of the Philippines Diliman with a fine arts degree, and from the Rhode Island School of Design with honors and a performance art degree in the 1990s, during which time he also worked various jobs "from cheese-counter boy to fish-station boy, from production assistant of a performance group, to technical director of a dance company".

Career
Celdran began his career as a cartoonist. At age 14, he worked under cartoonist Nonoy Marcelo and would deliver Marcelo's works by hand to the offices where Marcelo worked in: the Business Day and Manila Chronicle. He secured the stint through the connections of the husband of Patis Tesoro, who is Celdran's aunt. Carlos Celdran joined the Samahang Kartunista ng Pilipinas, a guild of Filipino cartoonists, and became its youngest member. His stint as a cartoonist lasted until he moved to the United States for his college education.

Upon his return to the Philippines, Celdran worked as a tour guide. His well-known and longest-running tour, If These Walls Could Talk, ran 17 years. As part of the guided tour in the Spanish-Era walled area of the Manila district of Intramuros, Celdran would sing, dance, and discuss the history of the place clad in costume.

Another work of Celdran was the one-man show Livin' La Vida Imelda that centered on the lavish lifestyle of Imelda Marcos, the wife of former Philippine President Ferdinand Marcos, who ruled as a dictator. The show was produced by Ma-Yi Theater Company, directed by Ralph Peña at Theater Row's Clurman Theater in New York City and other places outside the Philippines such as Toronto, Ontario, Canada; Copenhagen, Denmark; and Penang, Malaysia. After moving to Madrid, he started the Jose Rizal Walking Tour of Madrid, which took tourists to places where Filipino writer and revolutionary hero José Rizal had frequently visited during his study in the Spanish capital, and provided insights on how Rizal's experience is linked to the Philippine Revolution.

Activism

"Damaso stunt"
Celdran made national headlines after he interrupted an ecumenical meeting that was held in the Manila Cathedral in September 2010, in protest of the Philippine Catholic Church's perceived interference with the passage of the enacted Reproductive Health Bill. He had worn a José Rizal outfit, raised a placard that read "Damaso" at the altar, and is quoted as saying "Stop getting involved in politics!" Celdran's stunt, known colloquially as his "Damaso stunt", led to his arrest for "offending religious feelings" as per Article 133 of the Revised Penal Code. In January 2019, Celdran went into political exile in Madrid, Spain where he subsequently resided until his death.

In October 2019, Albay Representative Edcel Lagman (who was the author of the RH Bill) filed House Bill No. 5170 (or the "Carlos Celdran Bill") in Congress, which seeks to repeal Article 133 and, according to Lagman, would uphold the right to freedom of speech and expression (which are guaranteed in the Philippine Constitution) and separation of church and state in the Catholic-majority country of the Philippines. A petition was also launched at Change.org to push the bill's ratification.

Other
Celdran also opposed the construction of the Torre de Manila because it obstructed the line of sight behind the Rizal Monument.

Death
Celdran died of cardiac arrest on October 8, 2019, in Madrid, Spain. His widow, Tesa Celdran, confirmed the death.

See also
Freedom of religion in the Philippines

References

External links

1972 births
2019 deaths
20th-century Roman Catholics
Filipino activists
Filipino artists
Filipino expatriates in the United States
Filipino expatriates in Spain
Filipino Roman Catholics
Filipino secularists
Tagalog people
Rhode Island School of Design alumni
Roman Catholic activists
Tour guides
University of the Philippines Diliman alumni
People convicted of blasphemy
Filipino people of Spanish descent